Amarjit Kaur is an Indian politician. She was a Member of Parliament, representing Punjab in the Rajya Sabha the upper house of India's Parliament as a member of the Indian National Congress.

References

Rajya Sabha members from Punjab, India
Indian National Congress politicians
1939 births
Living people
Shiromani Akali Dal politicians